The 1990 24 Hours of Le Mans was the 58th Grand Prix of Endurance, and took place on 16 and 17 June 1990.

Background
Two chicanes were introduced along the Mulsanne Straight prior to the race. This was done to reduce the maximum speed of the cars after the Sauber C9 of Kenny Acheson reached  the previous year. FISA refused to renew the licence for the track unless the chicanes were installed to comply with a ruling passed by the World Motor Sport Council. The ruling decreed no circuit licensed by FISA may have a straight longer than 2km.

Defending race winners and world champions Sauber did not compete in the event after backers Mercedes pulled out when it was declared a non-championship race.

Qualifying

Qualifying was dominated by Nissan, with the Japanese marque claiming first, third, fourth and fifth on the grid. Mark Blundell in the #24 pulled out a phenomenal lap to qualify on pole position six seconds faster than anybody else (thanks partly due to his turbo wastegate stuck closed ). He was joined on the front row by the fastest Porsche, the Brun #16 of Oscar Larrauri. The #8 Joest Porsche had been one of the favourites going into the race, but its week was ended prematurely when with Jonathan Palmer at the wheel it crashed heavily at Mulsanne in Friday qualifying due to a suspension failure.

Class leaders are in bold

Race
The #25 Nissan which qualified fifth had a very short race. The car had to start from pit lane due to an issue with the gearbox on the grid, but it didn’t even complete a full lap before the problem proved terminal and it had to pull up.

The opening hours of the race looked much the same as qualifying, the Nissans swapping the lead with the Brun Porsche, whilst the Jaguars moved up the field after a sub-par qualifying. But four hours in a major incident occurred. Gianfranco Brancatelli driving the #24 collided with the Toyota of Aguri Suzuki at the Dunlop curve, the Japanese driver was uninjured but his car and the armco barrier were destroyed. Although the Nissan only had to pit to fix a damaged front nose, it was the beginning of the teams downfall; all of their cars would suffer from various problems during the night, with the #24 and #83 both dropping out. The incident also allowed the Jaguars to take control of the race, #1 in the lead with #4 and #3 also at the sharp end. Their sister car, #2, lost time when Franz Konrad beached it in the gravel at Indianapolis.

As night fell problems began to hit the Jaguar team, with both #1 and #4 hit by engine trouble, allowing #3 to assume the lead. The problems would eventually put the 1 out, and it sparked  a crucial decision from team boss Tom Walkinshaw. He decided to remove Eliseo Salazar (who’d yet to drive) from the 3 and replace him with their top driver Martin Brundle from the 1, in an attempt to maximise the car’s chances. The Chilean would subsequently be transferred into the 4 to replace Luis Pérez-Sala.

The decision paid off, as the #3 dominated the second half of the race allowing Brundle, John Nielsen and Price Cobb to claim victory by four laps, Jaguar’s second in three years.
Second place looked like it was heading to the Brun Porsche, but with just 15 minutes of the race remaining it blew its engine. A heartbreaking result for the Walter Brun’s privateer team who had been the fastest Porsche all week. This allowed the no. 2 Jaguar of Jan Lammers, Andy Wallace and Konrad to complete a 1-2 for the British marque. The misfortune of the Brun car also promoted the Japanese Alpha Racing Porsche, driven by the all-British crew of David Sears, Tiff Needell and Anthony Reid to a shock podium finish and the honour of top Porsche, ahead of the more fancied #7 Joest car. The remaining Nissan, the all-Japanese #23, completed the top five.

Official results
Class winners in bold.  Cars failing to complete 70% of the winner's distance marked as Not Classified (NC).

Statistics
 Pole Position - Mark Blundell, #24 Nissan Motorsports International - 3:27.020
 Fastest Lap - Steve Millen, #84 Nissan Performance Technology Inc. - 3:40.030
 Distance - 4882.4 km
 Average Speed - 204.036 km/h
 Highest Trap Speed — Jaguar XJR-12 -  (race), Nissan R90CK -  (qualifying)

References

24 Hours of Le Mans races
Le Mans
24 Hours of Le Mans
June 1990 sports events in Europe